Bonneville is an impact crater on Mars. It is located within the much larger crater Gusev. Bonneville was visited by the Mars Exploration Rover Spirit in 2004, during its exploration of the floor of Gusev. Bonneville is also the final resting place of Spirits heat shield, jettisoned during the landing procedure; the heat-shield could be seen glinting on the opposite wall when Spirit photographed the crater. The crater is 210 metres in diameter, 14 meters deep and its rim rises 6.4 metres above the surrounding terrain.

Bonneville is named after Benjamin Bonneville and Lake Bonneville, an ancient lake in Utah.

Formation and geology
The strata into which Bonneville formed is thought to be loose debris, although some of the ejecta may have originated from more competent rocks. No underlying bedrock was exposed in the crater or the numerous craterlets in Bonneville's walls.  The crater is relatively pristine and in particular has not been affected by water based erosion.

It is likely that Bonneville is a secondary crater, given its low depth to diameter ratio.

References

External links
 Official Mars Rovers site
 

Impact craters on Mars
Aeolis quadrangle